Frank Gardiner, the King of the Road is a 1911 Australian film about the bushranger Frank Gardiner, played by John Gavin, who also directed. It is considered a lost film.

Plot
The movie consists of 25 scenes. Frank Gardiner, real name Frank Christie (John Gavin), is a Goulburn boy accused of theft by his father, and ordered to quit. He meets his future wife and starts bushranging. His sweetheart's father throws her into the sea but Gardiner saves her. After several adventures he winds up in gaol, where he has been sentenced to serve 32 years' hard labor. After 10 years, however, he is released and he moves to America.

Cast
 John Gavin as Frank Gardiner

Production
During the shooting of a scene where troopers were chasing after Gardiner, a horse collapsed and damaged its knee. In another scene which apparently made the final cut, Gardiner fires a pistol point blank in a trooper's face, and the latter was burnt and blackened with the powder.

Reception
One critic thought that:
The best points about it is Gardiner's rescue of Annie Brown from drowning, the delivery from a convict's assault of the gaol governor's little daughter, and the finale where the ex-bushranger, exiled to America, at length (after a bitter goal experience) realizes the fact that "Honesty is the best Policy," which he seeks to inculcate apparently into his daughter and his daughter's sweetheart. That it is a thrilling continuation of desperate scenes that should never have occurred in Australia goes without saying, but it has the extremely bad tendency of holding up to the juvenile portion of the audience (who applauded most vociferously whenever law and order was trampled upon) an utter contempt for one of the most useful, respectable and reputable body of men in the Government service- the police.

References

External links
 

1911 films
1911 Western (genre) films
1911 lost films
Australian black-and-white films
Bushranger films
Films directed by John Gavin
Films set in colonial Australia
Lost Australian films
Lost Western (genre) films
Silent Australian Western (genre) films
Silent drama films